Karkhaneh may refer to:
 Karkhaneh, Hamadan
 Karkhaneh, Kermanshah
 Karkhaneh, Markazi
 Karkhaneh-ye Hakim
 Karkhaneh Sefid Kan